The Pathfinder is a 1987 Soviet adventure film directed by Pavel Lyubimov.

Plot 
The film takes place during the English-French War of Dominance in North America. The film tells the story of a young girl Mabel Dungam, who goes to the English fort and meets officer Jasper and the pathfinder on the way.

Cast 
 Yuri Avsharov as Duncan
 Andrejs Zagars as Natt Bumppo (as Andris Zagars)
 Anastasiya Nemolyaeva as Mabel
 Emmanuil Vitorgan as Craig
 Andrey Mironov as Sanglis
 Aleksandr Glazun as Arrowhead
 Igor Rogachyov
 Georgiy Yumatov as Kan
 Sergei Kovalyov as Sandy
 Tatyana Augskap as Jenny

References

External links 
 

1987 films
1980s Russian-language films
Soviet adventure films
1980s adventure films